David Allan Millar (born 1 March 1945) was a Scottish professional footballer who played as an inside forward in the Scottish League for St Mirren, Raith Rovers, Queen's Park, Stranraer and Aberdeen. He was capped by Scotland at amateur level.

References 

Scottish footballers
Scottish Football League players
Queen's Park F.C. players
Association football inside forwards
Scotland amateur international footballers
1945 births
Aberdeen F.C. players
Raith Rovers F.C. players
St Mirren F.C. players
Stranraer F.C. players
People from Gourock
Living people
Footballers from Inverclyde